The Quarrel is a 1991 Canadian film directed by Eli Cohen and starring Saul Rubinek and R. H. Thomson. The film was written by David Brandes and Joseph Telushkin.

Plot 
Two estranged friends – one a rabbi and the other an agnostic writer— are compelled to resume an argument that caused a separation between the pair many years earlier, after a chance meeting pushes the duo together once more.

See also 
 List of Holocaust films

References

External links 
 
 The Quarrel - movie website by the producer
The Quarrel live touring production

1991 films
English-language Canadian films
Canadian drama films
Films about Jews and Judaism
Jews and Judaism in Montreal
Films directed by Eli Cohen
Films set in Montreal
Films shot in Montreal
Films set in parks
1990s English-language films
1990s Canadian films